Zollar may mean:

 Jawole Willa Jo Zollar
Zimbabwe RTGS Dollar